Graduation Day may refer to:

 Graduation, when one receives an academic degree or similar designation

Film and TV
 Graduation Day (film), a 1981 slasher film
 Graduation Day, a 1968 film directed by Donald Shebib
 "Graduation Day" (The 4400 episode), a 2006 episode of The 4400
 "Graduation Day" (Beavis and Butt-head), a 1997 episode of Beavis and Butt-head
 "Graduation Day" (Buffy the Vampire Slayer), a 1999 two-part third-season finale episode of Buffy the Vampire Slayer
 "Graduation Day" (ER), a 2006 episode of ER
 "Graduation Day" (X-Men), the 1997 series finale episode of X-Men

Books and comics
 Titans/Young Justice: Graduation Day, a 2003 limited series by DC Comics
 Graduation Day, a 2000 Baby-sitters Club novel

Music

Albums
 Graduation Day, a 2012 album by Sturm und Drang

Songs
 "Graduation Day" (The Four Freshmen song), a 1956 song by Joe Sherman and Noel Sherman
 "Graduation Day", a 1963 song by Bobby Pickett
 "Graduation Day", a 1965 song by the band The Ivy League 
 "Graduation Day", a 1995 song by Chris Isaak in Forever Blue
 "Graduation Day", a 2004 song by Kanye West from The College Dropout
 "Graduation Day", a 2006 song by Head Automatica in Popaganda